Rătești is a commune in Argeș County, Muntenia, Romania. It is composed of seven villages: Ciupa-Mănciulescu, Furduești, Mavrodolu, Nejlovelu, Pătuleni, Rătești and Tigveni.

References

Communes in Argeș County
Localities in Muntenia